is a dam in Kami, Kōchi Prefecture, Japan, completed in 1963.

References 

Dams in Kōchi Prefecture
Dams completed in 1963